No. 176 Squadron RAF was a Royal Air Force Squadron that was a night defence unit based in India in World War II.

History

Formation in World War II
The squadron was formed at Dum Dum, India on 15 January 1943 from a detachment of No. 89 Squadron RAF, flying radar-equipped Bristol Beaufighter night fighters in defence of Calcutta. That night, it flew its first operational sorties, with Flight Sergeant Arthur Pring shooting down three Japanese Mitsubishi Ki-21 bombers in four minutes, becoming an air ace. On the night of 19/20 January, another of 176's aircraft intercepted three more Ki-21s, claiming two destroyed and one damaged, but itself being shot down by return fire from the bombers. In fact, only one of the Ki-21s was shot down. The losses of four bombers in a few days caused Japanese night attacks on Calcutta to be suspended. Detachments of the squadron were then based at Chittagong Burma, Ratmalana Ceylon, Baigachi and Mingaladon where the Beaufighters were replaced with Mosquitos in June 1945. The squadron disbanded on 1 June 1946.

Aircraft operated

Notes

References

External links
 History of No.'s 176–180 Squadrons at RAF Web
 176 Squadron history on the official RAF website

176
Military units and formations established in 1943